The 2018 Swiss Open Gstaad (also known as the 2018 J. Safra Sarasin Swiss Open Gstaad for sponsorship reasons) was a men's tennis tournament played on outdoor clay courts. It was the 51st edition of the Swiss Open, and part of the ATP World Tour 250 Series of the 2018 ATP World Tour. It took place at the Roy Emerson Arena in Gstaad, Switzerland, from 23 July through 29 July 2018.

Singles main draw entrants

Seeds 

 1 Rankings are as of 16 July 2018.

Other entrants 
The following players received wildcards into the main draw:
  Nicolás Almagro
  Félix Auger-Aliassime
  Marc-Andrea Hüsler

The following players received entry from the qualifying draw:
  Facundo Bagnis
  Yannick Hanfmann
  Adrián Menéndez Maceiras
  Jürgen Zopp

The following players received entry as lucky losers:
  Viktor Galović
  Oriol Roca Batalla

Withdrawals 
Before the tournament
  Evgeny Donskoy → replaced by  Guido Andreozzi
  Mikhail Kukushkin → replaced by  Viktor Galović
  Guido Pella → replaced by  Oriol Roca Batalla
  Viktor Troicki → replaced by  Denis Istomin

Doubles main draw entrants

Seeds 

1 Rankings are as of 16 July 2018.

Other entrants 
The following pairs received wildcards into the doubles main draw:
  Adrian Bodmer /  Jakub Paul
  Marc-Andrea Hüsler /  Luca Margaroli

The following pair received entry as alternates:
  Guido Andreozzi /  Jaume Munar

Withdrawals 
Before the tournament
  Guido Pella

Champions

Singles 

  Matteo Berrettini def.  Roberto Bautista Agut, 7–6(11–9), 6–4

Doubles 

  Matteo Berrettini /  Daniele Bracciali def.  Denys Molchanov /  Igor Zelenay, 7–6(7–2), 7–6(7–5)

External links

References 

Swiss Open Gstaad
Swiss Open (tennis)
2018 in Swiss tennis
July 2018 sports events in Switzerland